The Tyre District is a district in the South Governorate of Lebanon.

History

Ancient history
Founded at the start of the third millennium BC, Tyre originally consisted of a mainland settlement and a modest island city that lay a short distance off shore. It became an increasingly important port city in the region in the first millennium BC Phoenicia.

In the 10th century BC, Hiram I, king of Tyre, joined two islets by landfill. Later, he extended the city further by reclaiming a considerable area from the sea. Phoenician expansion began around 815 BC when traders from Tyre founded Carthage in North Africa. Eventually its colonies spread around the Mediterranean and Atlantic, bringing to the city a flourishing maritime trade. Early in the sixth century BC, Nebuchadnezzar II, king of the Neo-Babylonian Empire, laid siege to the walled city for thirteen years. Tyre stood firm, but it was probable that at this time the residents of the mainland city abandoned it for the safety of the island. The conflict ended with Tyre accepting Babylonian rule.

Hellenistic period
Alexander the Great, in 332 BC, set out to conquer this strategic coastal city during the war between the Greeks and the Persians. Unable to storm the city, he blockaded it for seven months. Tyre held on but the conqueror used the debris of the abandoned mainland city to build a causeway and once within reach of the city's walls, Alexander used his siege engines to batter and finally breach the fortifications.

So enraged at the Tyrians' defense and the number of men lost in the battle, Alexander destroyed half of the city. The town's 30,000 residents were massacred or sold into slavery. Tyre and the whole of ancient Syria fell under Roman rule in 64 BC. Nonetheless, for some time Tyre continued to mint its own silver coins.

Roman era
The Romans built great important monuments in the city, including an aqueduct, a triumphal arch and the largest hippodrome in antiquity. Christianity appears in the history of Tyre, with the name Tyre being mentioned in the New Testament frequently. During the Byzantine era the Archbishop of Tyre was the primate of all the bishops of Phoenicia. At that time, the city once again became very important in the region, as can be seen in the remains of its buildings and the inscriptions in the necropolis.

Islamic era
Tyre surrendered to the Islamic armies in 634, the city offered no resistance and continued to prosper under its new rulers, exporting of sugar as well as objects made of pearl and glass making was a good source of income for the city.
With the decline of the Abbasid caliphate, Tyre acquired some independence under the dynasty of Banu Aqil, vassals of the Fatimid Caliphate. This was a time when Tyre was adorned with fountains and its bazaar were full of different kinds of merchandise including carpets and jewelry of gold and silver.

Tyre was conquered by the Crusaders in 1124. After about 180 years of Crusader rule, the Mamluk retook the city in 1291, until it fell under the control of the Ottomans at the start of the 16th century.

Lebanese era
With the end of World War I, Tyre was integrated into the new nation of Lebanon.

External links

 Tyre District

 
Districts of Lebanon